Aileen Donnelly is an Irish judge who has served as a Judge of the Court of the Appeal since June 2019. She previously served as a Judge of the High Court from 2014 to 2019.

Legal career
Donnelly attended University College Dublin, where she obtained a BCL degree in 1986 and a master's degree in equality studies in 1995. She also attended the King's Inns. In 1988, she was called to the Bar. Between 1996 and 2002, she was a board member and co-chair of the Irish Council for Civil Liberties (ICCL). She was counsel for a complainant in the Commission to Inquire into Child Abuse. In 2004, she was called to the Inner Bar. She has published legal texts on tax law, the law of the European Convention on Human Rights and gender and law.

Judicial career

High Court 
She was appointed a Judge of the High Court in September 2014. She was in charge of High Court extradition cases. Donnelly postponed an order of extradition for a man to Poland in 2018, as a result of the 2015 Polish Constitutional Court crisis. She referred the issue to the Court of Justice of the European Union. Her subsequent decision did not find that there was a specific threat to the accused man's rights to a fair trial. Donnelly's preliminary decision received substantial personal criticism from some Polish media publications, leading to Association of Judges of Ireland and the European Association of Judges writing statements of support for the judge.

Court of Appeal 
Donnelly became a Judge of the Court of Appeal in June 2019. Her appointment followed the elevation of Mary Irvine to the Supreme Court of Ireland.

Personal life
She was the first openly gay member to serve on the High Court and subsequently of the Court of Appeal. She is married to Dr. Susan Miner.

References

Year of birth missing (living people)
Living people
Alumni of University College Dublin
High Court judges (Ireland)
Irish Council for Civil Liberties
LGBT judges
Irish lesbians
Place of birth missing (living people)
Judges of the Court of Appeal (Ireland)
Alumni of King's Inns
21st-century Irish LGBT people